Eleanor Poppy Miranda de Freitas (26 June 1990 – 4 April 2014) was an English woman who committed suicide three days before the commencement of her trial for perverting the course of justice for allegedly making a false accusation of rape. Her death prompted a debate over whether prosecuting people accused of making a false accusation of rape could deter rape victims from reporting the crime, as well as whether it was appropriate to prosecute vulnerable individuals (de Freitas had been diagnosed with bipolar disorder and depression and was judged by a psychiatrist to represent a suicide risk).

The decision to prosecute de Freitas was ultimately upheld by both the Director of Public Prosecutions and the Attorney General for England and Wales, while the Metropolitan Police Service paid compensation to the accused man, albeit without admitting liability. From a legal perspective, the case was notable due to the use of a private prosecution (relatively uncommon under English law) and, subsequently, the first successful employment of a public interest defence to a charge of defamation.

Timeline of events

Background 
Eleanor Poppy Miranda de Freitas was born on 26 June 1990 and grew up in Fulham, London. She attended the private Putney High School, achieving straight As in her A Level exams. In 2008 she enrolled in Grey College, Durham University to study geography. During her first year, she suffered a mental breakdown. She was diagnosed with bipolar disorder and depression and began seeing a psychiatrist, who prescribed her antidepressants. At the end of the 2008/09 academic year, de Freitas dropped out of Durham University.

In February 2012, de Freitas had another mental breakdown. She accused her parents of trying to poison her and her landlord of sexually assaulting her; went on unaffordable shopping sprees; and became delusional. She was involuntarily committed under the Mental Health Act 1983 and spent a month in Ealing Hospital, where she was reportedly mentally and physically abused. After successfully challenging her detention at a Mental Health Review Tribunal and being released, de Freitas began living alone with support from her parents and working part-time in a branch of The Body Shop on King's Road in Chelsea. Unbeknown to her parents, she reportedly also worked as a tantric masseuse and escort. In summer 2013, she began training as an accountant.

Rape allegations 
In 2008 or 2009, de Freitas met Alexander Economou, the sometime company secretary of his family-run shipping agency. They became acquaintances after attending the same party in Chelsea in October 2012. On 23 December 2012, de Freitas and Economou met alone for the first and only time and had sex. The following day, they went shopping together, including a trip to an Ann Summers sex shop. Subsequently, Economou ended the relationship with de Freitas; de Freitas was upset by the ending of the relationship, and made this known to others, including sending a text to one friend saying Economou had "fucked her and chucked her" and to another saying "I don't understand what I have done wrong???".

On 4 January 2013, de Freitas alleged to the Metropolitan Police Service that Economou had raped her. In an interview with police, she asserted that she "wasn't in control of my body" due to combining alcohol with her bipolar medicine and was unable to consent; that Economou had "drugged" her; that she had been "frozen with fear"; and that Economou had coerced her into allowing him to tie her up, "waterboard" her, and have unprotected sex with her. Economou was arrested and spent a night in custody. On 20 February 2013, the Police decided to take no further action against Economou; he was never charged. Economou asserted that the sex had been consensual; that he had ended the relationship on 24 December 2012 contending de Freitas was working as a tantric masseuse and after receiving "crazy" text messages from de Freitas; and that de Freitas had fabricated the rape claim "as an act of revenge, because I rejected her".

Prosecution 
In August 2013, Economou launched a private prosecution of de Freitas for perverting the course of justice at a cost of approximately £200,000. Economou amassed witness statements, text messages and closed-circuit television footage that he contended contradicted the account of de Freitas, including footage of de Freitas and himself shopping together for sex toys at an Ann Summers shop on the day following the alleged rape and text messages de Freitas had sent to mutual friends. Upon receiving the summons on 13 August 2013, de Freitas reportedly had a panic attack. She engaged a defence solicitor who invited Keir Starmer, the Director of Public Prosecutions of the Crown Prosecution Service, to use his statutory power to take over the private prosecution and end it. However, in December 2013, the Crown Prosecution Service instead announced that it would take over and continue the prosecution. De Freitas subsequently enquired whether there was scope to seek an injunction against reporting on the prosecution. The Metropolitan Police Service officers who had investigated the alleged rape refused to support the Crown Prosecution Service but were overruled. De Freitas was arraigned at Southwark Crown Court on 24 January 2014, pleading not guilty.

Rape counselling services were withdrawn from de Freitas upon the commencement of the prosecution (in March 2015, Member of Parliament Valerie Vaz asked Solicitor General for England and Wales Robert Buckland to "review the guidance to ensure that the provision of support and counselling services to vulnerable people is not removed abruptly"). De Freitas became "severely" depressed and her behaviour became erratic, including claiming she was being followed and that her phone was being tapped and wearing a burqa when going out in public. In September 2013, she was found in a branch of Co-op Food on Strand throwing crisp packets and shouting at staff. In December 2013, de Freitas attempted to drive from London to  Northamptonshire to spend Christmas with her family but, after taking a wrong turn on the A1 road, continued driving until running out of petrol; her father characterised this as disorientation stemming from trauma. A psychiatric report prepared for the Crown Prosecution Service stated that de Freitas was fit to stand trial but required constant evaluation as she posed a "chronic and significant" suicide risk. Her doctor did not prescribe lithium for her bipolar disorder as de Freitas suffered from a fear of needles.

Suicide 
On 4 April 2014, de Freitas committed suicide by hanging herself at her family home in Fulham, London. Her trial for perverting the course of justice had been due to commence on 7 April. She left a suicide note in which she stated, "If I were to lose the case I know that I would have brought huge shame on the family. It's entirely my fault for what has happened and there are many other events which make me make this decision." She also expressed fears about potentially having to testify in court in her defence and stated she was "ashamed to be British". De Freitas had previously expressed fears about being involuntarily committed once again.

At an inquest held by the West London Coroner's Court in March 2015, coroner Chinyere Inyama recorded a verdict of suicide by hanging and noted that the impending trial had been a "significant stressor" on de Freitas. A call by solicitor Harriet Wistrich on behalf of de Freitas' family to widen the scope of the inquest to assess whether the Crown Prosecution Service had breached the right to life enshrined in the Human Rights Act 1998 by prosecuting de Freitas was unsuccessful. The call for a special inquest was supported by Emily Thornberry, the then-Shadow Attorney General for England and Wales.

Reaction 
Following de Freitas' suicide, her father David criticised the decision to prosecute her, stating, "We can see no reason whatsoever why the CPS pursued Eleanor. If the CPS had put a stop to it at the time I would still have a daughter." David de Freitas suggested that de Freitas had feared once again being involuntarily committed and was embarrassed that "extraneous evidence" would emerge during the trial alleging work in the sex industry. De Freitas had been concerned about having to testify in her defence in court; delays by the Crown Prosecution Service in providing a record of her interview with police to her defence solicitor meant they were unable to confirm that she would not be required to testify until the morning of her death (a court order requiring the Crown Prosecution Service to disclose all evidence at least six weeks prior to the trial was not complied with). The Crown Prosecution Service later apologised for the delay in the disclosure of the evidence, whilst still blaming the police for the delay.

The decision to prosecute de Freitas was also criticised by the organisation Women Against Rape, which argued that the "aggressive pursuit" of women accused of making false allegations of rape in the United Kingdom was deterring rape victims from reporting the crime to the police. The charity Victim Support released a statement expressing concerns about the use of private prosecutions to "intimidate" people making allegations of rape, while the charity Justice for Women stated "the public interest is always overwhelmingly in favour of not prosecuting a rape complainant" and "it is imperative that the overwhelming public interest in improving the UK's appallingly low conviction rate for rape offences is considered by all prosecutors when deciding whether to charge women for perverting the course of justice". Lisa Avalos, of the Louisiana State University Paul M. Hebert Law Center, stated that the United Kingdom makes significantly more prosecutions for false rape allegations than the United States, and that these carry a charge of perverting the course of justice (with a maximum sentence of life in prison) rather than false reporting (which carries lighter penalties such as community service, fines, or probation). The charity Inquest cited statistics showing "no country pursues the prosecution of disbelieved rape complainants with the frequency that occurs in Britain". Writing in January 2022, Harriet Wistrich of the Centre for Women's Justice stated that "bipolar disorder, the illness that Eleanor was diagnosed with, can cause hypersexuality during manic episodes" and that "it is an enduring tragedy for Eleanor's family that the CPS pursued this prosecution when a psychiatric report warned of the risk of completed suicide." Writing in The Critic in February 2022, Julie Bindel stated that "the CPS is advised to exercise extreme caution when deciding whether to prosecute on suspicion of making a false allegation, especially if the person is vulnerable or if it is unclear whether the accusation was made maliciously".

An alternative view was expressed by journalist Radhika Sanghani, who wrote that "false rape allegations can have devastating consequences for the accused" and noted that over a 17 month period in 2011 to 2012 there were only 35 prosecutions for false rape allegations in England and Wales, compared to 5,651 prosecutions for rape. Sarah Green of the End Violence Against Women Coalition opined, "We must prosecute these cases if someone's trying to maliciously get someone into trouble."

In the 2019 publication Personal Participation in Criminal Proceedings, Dr. Kate Leader wrote that the case "has drawn attention to the issues that can arise from private prosecutions". In mid-2020, the House of Commons Justice Select Committee made a call for evidence on an inquiry into the use of private prosecutions. The Centre for Women's Justice provided written evidence to the inquiry in which it stated "Eleanor, for example, was never interviewed as a suspect; she sat in the dock without having ever been arrested, or her rights explained to her as a defendant, and without having had the opportunity to respond to the allegations against her."

Subsequent legal proceedings 

De Freitas' suicide prompted Director of Public Prosecutions Alison Saunders to review the decision to prosecute. In December 2014, Saunders concluded that it had been correct to do so, stating that there was "sufficient evidence for a realistic prospect of conviction" and "a strong public interest in prosecuting". Saunders also stated that medical experts had advised that de Freitas was fit to stand trial. After de Freitas' father David called for a new inquiry or a review to be carried out, in June 2018, Attorney General for England and Wales Jeremy Wright decided not to order an independent inquiry into the decision to prosecute, stating, "I have carefully considered the concerns raised by Mr de Freitas and I am satisfied that this case has already been subject to extensive scrutiny within the CPS, and that it was right for the prosecution to go ahead."

In December 2014, Alexander Economou began a libel claim against David de Freitas, asserting that articles critical of the Crown Prosecution Service appearing in The Daily Telegraph and The Guardian and an interview with John Humphrys on the Today programme broadcast on BBC Radio 4 had resulted in his enduring "public rubbishing" and damaged his reputation. The claim was dismissed in July 2016 with the judge ruling that, while the publications had defamatory meaning and had caused harm to Economou's reputation, this was justified given de Freitas had considered the articles and broadcast to be in the public interest and that ruling in favour of Economou would represent a disproportionate infringement upon de Freitas' freedom of speech. The judge stated "When a person suffering from mental ill-health kills herself at a time when she is facing public prosecution for making a false allegation of rape there is a clear public interest in considering whether there is a causal link and, if so, whether the decision-making was at fault and there are lessons to be learned." This represented the first time a public interest defence had been successfully mounted under the Defamation Act 2013. An appeal by Economou against the ruling was dismissed by the Court of Appeal in November 2018. Economou subsequently sought permission to appeal to the Supreme Court of the United Kingdom which was refused. Whilst David de Freitas's public interest defence was not directly challenged in the Supreme Court, it was examined at some length in the defamation appeal in Serafin v Malkiewicz and others. Lord Wilson, delivering the unanimous judgement of the five-member panel, dismissed this criticism with the words "I can discern no basis for that criticism".

The BBC issued a retraction and apology in May 2015 after Lisa Longstaff of Women Against Rape indirectly referred to Economou as a "rapist" while being interviewed on a live episode of Victoria Derbyshire.

In December 2015, Economou was charged with harassing David de Freitas. It was alleged that Economou had sent letters and emails to de Freitas and his solicitor, Harriet Wistrich, and "uploaded various recordings and comments onto websites". Economou was found not guilty in June 2016, with the judge stating, "I find that the defendant's actions were calculated to counter the continuing incorrect assertions that the allegation of rape was true".

In November 2018, Economou received £10,000 of compensation from the Metropolitan Police Service, albeit without admitting liability, in connection with their investigation of the initial complaint made by de Freitas.

References

External links 
 Statement from the Attorney General for England and Wales
 Alexander Economou website

Freitas, Eleanor de
Freitas, Eleanor de
2014 in London
Freitas, Eleanor de
English defamation case law
False allegations of sex crimes
Freitas, Eleanor de
Suicides by hanging in England
Suicides in Fulham